Kot Lalloo railway station is located in Kot Lalloo village, Khairpur District of Sindh, Pakistan.

See also
 List of railway stations in Pakistan
 Pakistan Railways
 Kot lalu

References

External links

Railway stations in Khairpur District
Railway stations on Karachi–Peshawar Line (ML 1)